White Wings is a 1923 American silent comedy film starring Stan Laurel.

Cast
 Stan Laurel – Street cleaner
 James Finlayson – Dental patient
 Marvin Loback – A cop
 Katherine Grant – Nurse
 Mark Jones – Dental patient
 George Rowe – Cross-eyed man with dime
 William Gillespie

See also
 List of American films of 1923

References

External links

1923 films
1923 comedy films
1923 short films
Silent American comedy films
American silent short films
American black-and-white films
Films directed by George Jeske
American comedy short films
1920s American films